Oreoglanis siamensis, the Siamese bat catfish, is a species of sisorid catfish in the Sisoridae endemic to Thailand where it is found in the Chao Phraya and Mekong River basins.  This species grows to a length of  SL. It lives only in streams of 1,200 meters (3,937 ft) above sea level.

It was first studied and described by American ichthyologist H.M. Smith from type specimen were taken from  Doi Luang Ang Ka (today's Doi Inthanon)'s stream by Karen in December, 1928. Later it was found in many streams as a branch of the Ping River in Chiang Mai Province.

In Thailand, this species is one of four species of freshwater fish that the fish is protected by the Department of Fisheries in 1992 consist of Siamese bat catfish (Oreoglanis siamensis),  Asian bonytongue fish or dragon fish (Scleropages formosus),  Siamese tiger perch (Coius pulcher) and dwarf loach or Aree's loach (Yasuhikotakia sidthimunki).

References
 

Fish of Thailand
Fish of Asia
Oreoglanis
Endemic fauna of Thailand
Taxonomy articles created by Polbot
Taxa named by Hugh McCormick Smith
Fish described in 1933